Issara Kachaiwong (born October 4, 1983, in Chanthaburi, Thailand), is a former Thai professional snooker player.

Career
Kachaiwong first came to public attention in 2002 when he became the Thai national under-20 champion. He continued to impress on the amateur scene winning the first edition of the General Cup International, defeating players like Mark Allen and Dominic Dale and also capturing a gold medal at the 2004 Thai Games, before he finally qualified for the main tour by winning the 2006 Asian championships, defeating Mohammed Shehab 6–3 in the final.

His best performance in the debut season came at the 2006 Grand Prix in October in Aberdeen. During that tournament he impressed, winning 4 of his five matches during the group stages. His only loss came against John Higgins. However he failed to make the top two as both Higgins and Alan McManus, who Kachaiwong had beaten, had better frame differences. He was the only player who won four times in the group stages who did not make it through to the knockout stages. The rest of Kachaiwong's results was not good enough to keep him on tour, but he was handed a wild card for another season. Despite a last 64 run at the season-ending World Championship, he was again relegated.

At the 2010 ACBS Asian Snooker Championship Kachaiwong beat Mohammad Sajjad from Pakistan 7–3 in the final to become the champion and regained his tour card for the 2010–11 season. Once again he struggled for results, his best performance coming at the China Open where he reached the final qualifying round. He finished the season 87th in the world rankings and failed to retain his place on the tour.

Performance and rankings timeline

Career finals

Non-ranking finals: 2 (1 title)

Pro-am finals: 2 (2 titles)

Amateur finals: 5 (4 titles)

References

External links

Issara Kachaiwong
Living people
1983 births
Issara Kachaiwong
Issara Kachaiwong
Southeast Asian Games medalists in cue sports
Competitors at the 2005 Southeast Asian Games